Gemmula fenestrata is a species of sea snail, a marine gastropod mollusk in the family Turridae, the turrids.

References

External links
  Tucker, J.K. 2004 Catalog of recent and fossil turrids (Mollusca: Gastropoda). Zootaxa 682:1-1295.

fenestrata
Gastropods described in 1990